Nourrice was the first of two flûtes (supply ships) built to a design by Raymond-Antoine Haran. She was launched on 3 August 1792 at Bayonne and coppered in 1795. She served at Brest and Toulon, until a British squadron cornered her in the Bay of Sagone on Corsica's east coast in 1811 and destroyed her.

French service
Nourrice served as a transport and there exist some reports of particular voyages or periods of service. 
Between August and November 1792 she was under the command of lieutenant de vaisseau Minbielle. She carried timber for naval construction from Bayonne to Rochefort and then returned to Bayonne.
Between January and July 1793 she was under the command of capitaine de vaisseau Gauthier. He sailed her from Rochefort to Pauillac.
In Prairial Year 10 (approx. May 1802), enseigne de vaisseau Pallois sailed her from Rochefort to Port-au-Prince, carrying troops and supplies. 
From Pluviôse to Floréal Year 11 (approx. January to May 1803), Nourrice transported troops from Genoa to Elba, while under the command of lieutenant de vaisseau Vatel.
From Nivôse  Year 12 to Brumaire  Year 13 (approx. December 1804 to October 1805), she was still under Vatel's command. She made several voyages, carrying troops from Toulon to Corsica via Golfe-Juan. Next she was at Villefranche, and then she carried passengers,  artillery, and funds from Toulon to Genoa and San Fiorenzo, Corsica.

Fate (British Account)

On 30 April 1811, Nourrice, the 26-gun Girafe, and an armed merchant vessel, were anchored in the Bay of Sagone on Corsica's east coast. They were laden with wood for the naval arsenal at Toulon and had taken refuge under the protection of a shore battery of four guns and a mortar, a Martello tower armed with a gun overlooking the battery, and some 200 troops with field pieces, assisted by armed local inhabitants, all on a heights overlooking the vessels. Here the British ships , Unite, and  found them. The next day Captain Robert Barrie of Pomone had boats from Pomone and Scout tow their ships close to the French vessels. After a 90-minute exchange of fire, Giraffe and Nourrice caught fire.{{Giraffe had been built at La Ciotat and launched in 1809.}} Brands from Nourrice set fire to the merchant vessel. 

Barrie had the British withdraw, awaiting the explosion of the French vessels. The battery and the tower fell silent. Shortly thereafter the Giraffe exploded, and then so did Nourrice. Some of the timbers from Nourrice fell on the tower, demolishing it, with further sparks setting fire to the shore battery, which also blew up. With nothing left to accomplish, the British withdrew. The action cost the British two men killed and 25 wounded.

Fate (French account) & subsequent developments
French accounts report that their crews set Girafe and Nourrice on fire, and then abandoned their vessels. The armed merchant vessel was the Henriette, and her crew ran her ashore. A police report states that French casualties were four gunners and two sailors killed, and 30 men wounded. The subsequent court martial acquitted their two captains, lieutenants de vaisseau Renault and Figanière.

Postscript
The wreck of the Giraffe was found in 1983. That of Nourrice was found in 2007 in front of the port as a result of a project to build a new port.

Notes, citations, and references
Notes

Citations

References
 
Fonds Marine. Campagnes (opérations ; divisions et stations navales ; missions diverses). Inventaire de la sous-série Marine BB4. Tome premier : BB4 1 à 209 (1790-1804) 
 Fonds Marine. Campagnes (opérations ; divisions et stations navales ; missions diverses). Inventaire de la sous-série Marine BB4. Tome premier : BB4 210 à 482 (1805-1826) 
 

 

1792 ships
Age of Sail ships of France
Ships built in France
Maritime incidents in 1811